George Pearse may refer to:

George Pearse, High Sheriff of Bedfordshire in 1833
George Pearse, auto racer in the 1947 Australian Grand Prix

See also
George Pearce (disambiguation)
George Peirce (disambiguation)
George Pierce (disambiguation)